Limia melanonotata, the blackbanded limia, is a toothcarp in the family Poeciliidae. It is endemic to the island of Hispaniola (in both Haiti and the Dominican Republic).

Taxonomic history
John Treadwell Nichols and George S. Myers wrote their species description for L. melanonotata in 1923. The holotype and 22 paratypes were collected by Gladwyn Kingsley Noble in Las Lagas, Hispaniola. Nichols and Myers also identified a specimen collected by F. E Watson in Manville, Haiti as belonging to this species. The holotype is at the American Museum of Natural History.

For those who recognize Limia as a distinct genus, this species is in its subgenus Limia. Others classify it in the Limia subgenus within  the Poecilia  genus.

Some ichthyologists have suggested that L. melanonotata is synonymous with L. perugiae.

Distribution
It is found in the lower Artibonite River, Plain of the Cul-de-Sac, Haiti; extending to the Valle de Neiba (nl) in the southwestern Dominican Republic.

References

Further reading

 
 
 
 

melanonotata
Taxa named by John Treadwell Nichols
Taxa named by George S. Myers
Fish described in 1923
Endemic fauna of Hispaniola
Fish of the Dominican Republic